The following is the final results of the Iranian Volleyball Super League (Velayat Cup) 1998/99 season.

Standings

 Abrisham Rasht withdrew from the league.

References 
 volleyball.ir

League 1998-99
Iran Super League, 1998-99
Iran Super League, 1998-99
Volleyball League, 1998-99
Volleyball League, 1998-99